Appling v. Walker was a state court lawsuit that challenged the constitutionality of Wisconsin's domestic partnership registry. The action began as a petition for original action before the Wisconsin Supreme Court asking the Court for a declaration that the registry is unconstitutional and for a permanent injunction against the registry, which began registering couples on August 3, 2009. On November 4, 2009, the Court declined to take the case. Petitioners then refiled in state circuit court and the court ruled in June 2011 that the registry is constitutional. That decision was affirmed by a state appeals court in December 2012, and by the Wisconsin Supreme Court in July 2014.

History
On June 29, 2009, Wisconsin Governor Jim Doyle signed the same-sex domestic partnership registry into law as a provision of the 2010-11 state budget. The registry created a legal recognition of same-sex unions in Wisconsin, enumerating 43 rights and benefits for registered couples.

On July 23, 2009, Julaine Appling, President of Wisconsin Family Action, through attorneys at the Alliance Defense Fund (ADF) and ADF-allied attorneys in Wisconsin, filed an original action with the Wisconsin Supreme Court asking it to declare the same-sex domestic partnership registry unconstitutional and permanently enjoin the defendants from the enactment of the registry. Wisconsin Attorney General J. B. Van Hollen refused to defend the suit, then titled Appling v. Doyle, agreeing that the registry violated the state constitution. Doyle hired outside counsel to defend it.

The petition asserted that the registry violates Wisconsin's Marriage Protection Amendment, ratified by Wisconsin voters on November 7, 2006. The amendment states:

On September 22, 2009, Fair Wisconsin and its members, represented by Lambda Legal, filed a motion to intervene in the case. Five same-sex Wisconsin couples, who have registered as domestic partners and are being represented by the American Civil Liberties Union, also filed a motion to intervene. In a motion filed the same day, the ACLU asked the Wisconsin Supreme Court to deny the petitioners' request for the court to hear the case directly and to send the case to a trial court to develop a factual record. On November 4, the Supreme Court denied the petition.  Petitioners refiled the lawsuit in Dane County District Court in 2010.

In 2011, Scott Walker became the Governor of Wisconsin, and in March, he fired the lawyer representing the state. On May 13, Walker petitioned the trial court to allow the state to withdraw from the case, citing his belief that the registry is unconstitutional.

Argument
The petitioners claimed:

The petitioners believed the registry violated the Wisconsin Marriage Protection Amendment because it creates a new legal status for domestic partners. The requirements for obtaining a domestic partnership certificate are the same as those required for obtaining a marriage license. The price for a certificate is the same as for a marriage license.

The petitioners asked the Court to accept the case as an original action before the Court (instead of working the case up from the trial court level), to declare the same-sex domestic partnership registry unconstitutional, and to stop the enactment of the same-sex domestic partnership registry.

Parties

Petitioners
The petitioners in the case are Wisconsin residents and taxpayers and members of the board of directors of Wisconsin Family Action.
 Julaine Appling, Wisconsin Family Action President
 Jaren E. Hiller, Wisconsin Family Action board member
 Edmund L. Webster, Wisconsin Family Action board member

Respondents
 Scott Walker, in his official capacity as Governor of the State of Wisconsin
 Karen Timberlake, in her official capacity as Secretary of the Wisconsin Department of Health Services
 John Kiesow, in his official capacity as State Registrar of Vital Statistics

Intervening defendants
 Fair Wisconsin and its members
 Five same-sex Wisconsin couples who have registered as domestic partners since the law came into effect

Legal representation
Attorney Richard M. Esenberg, Michael D. Dean for the First Freedoms Foundation and attorneys Austin Nimocks and Brian Raum from the Alliance Defense Fund represented the Wisconsin Family Action board members. Madison attorney Lester Pine defended the state until being dismissed by Walker in March 2011. Brian Hagedorn filed the petition on behalf of Walker to withdraw from the case. Christopher Clark represented Fair Wisconsin.

Decisions
June 20, 2011: Circuit court Judge Dan Moeser ruled that the domestic partnership registry did not violate the state constitution, finding that the state "does not recognize domestic partnership in a way that even remotely resembles how the state recognizes marriage".

December 21, 2012: The District 4 Court of Appeals affirmed Judge Moeser's decision in a unanimous ruling.

July 31, 2014: The Wisconsin Supreme Court ruled unanimously that the registry is constitutional, citing statements made by proponents of the constitutional amendment at issue "that the Amendment simply would not preclude a mechanism for legislative grants of certain rights to same-sex couples".

See also 
 LGBT rights in Wisconsin
 Domestic partnerships in Wisconsin

References

External links
 
 WFA's Petition
 WFA's Press Release
 Video of the Appling talking about the legal challenge
 Fair Wisconsin Press Release
 ACLU of Wisconsin Press Release
 Appling v. Doyle - Case Profile

Wisconsin state case law
2014 in LGBT history
LGBT in Wisconsin
2014 in United States case law
2014 in Wisconsin
United States same-sex union case law